Chikunia is a genus of Asian comb-footed spiders that was first described by H. Yoshida in 2009. These spiders are small, often dark or orange colored. This species can be found in solidarity, though they can also be found in colonies.

Colonies 
The species C. bilde and C. nigra are unique for spiders, as they are capable of forming intra-species colonies, both spiders being each others closest relative. Both species care for their young, and are thought to do the same to their neighbor's young. These colonies can be around 100 strong, with each adult keeping a distinct territory inside the colony. Another question raised by this unique arrangement, is the fact that they are both genetically distinct species.

Species 
 it contains three species, found in Asia: 

 Chikunia albipes (Saito, 1935) – Eastern Russia, China, Korea, Japan

 Chikunia bilde Smith, Agnarsson & Grinsted, 2019 – Malaysia, Singapore, Indonesia
 Chikunia nigra (O. Pickard-Cambridge, 1880) – India, Sri Lanka to Taiwan, Indonesia.

See also
 List of Theridiidae species

References

Araneomorphae genera
Spiders of Asia
Theridiidae